Gilgamesh Restaurant Bar & Lounge was a restaurant and bar in Stables Market, Camden, London, opened in June 2006. Despite its Mesopotamian name and theme, the restaurant typically served South East Asian, Chinese and Japanese-inspired eclectic cuisine. The restaurant closed in January 2018.

The restaurant was inspired by the Sumerian king Gilgamesh. Furnished with dark wood and heavy furnishings, its owners claimed its reliefs and carvings were the work of over 10,000 workers from Northern India. It contains a range of exotic imagery, and is intended to evoke the mystique of the Babylonian era. Its interior is said to be an "ostentatious replica of a Babylonian palace". The tables and chairs are also supposed to be reminiscent of those of the palaces of Ancient Babylon. The London Restaurant Guide describes its bar as being like a theme park, and says, "This is one of those restaurants that sets great store by glitz and it certainly seems to strike a chord with a clientele that isn't too "bovvered" about the food, preferring cocktails, champagne and celebrity."

References

External links

 

Asian restaurants in London
Buildings and structures in the London Borough of Camden
Defunct restaurants in London
Restaurants disestablished in 2018
Restaurants established in 2006